Feldkirchen is a municipality in the district of Munich, Bavaria, Germany. It is located 10 km east of  Munich and has 5,987 inhabitants. Feldkirchen was first mentioned in a document dated 853.

Feldkirchen is home to Steico, a company for building products made from renewable raw materials.

Famous people
Ruth Drexel, actress and director

Gallery

References

External links

Munich (district)